8 vs 1 was a South Korean television show distributed by SBS. The show was aired every Monday at 23:15. It took over the timeslot left vacant when Yashimmanman was canceled.

Host 
 Shin Dong-yup
 Jung Chan-woo
 Kim Hee-chul (EP. 1-8, 10)
 Shim Eun-jin (EP. 1-6)
 Solbi (EP. 7-13)

Format 
Each week, the 4 MCs and 4 guest celebrity panelists try to guess the answers given by 50 people/couples who answered a survey. If they aren't able to guess all the answers given, the task is passed onto a contestant who has to guess at the answers for prize money.

 Episode 1
The panelists guess at the answers given by a survey of 50 people by picking up a placard with their own pictures on it or sitting on a whoopee cushion that is moving on a conveyor belt on a low table that they are sitting around. The panelists are allowed to make up to 50 guesses before they make 8 incorrect guesses. If they get a wrong answer, a strong gust of wind blows in their face. After 8 incorrect guesses, a contestant is given an opportunity. All they need is to find one correct answer within 60 seconds and they win $1000.

Episode 2-3 & 4 (second half)
The panelists guess at the answers given by a survey of 50 people by picking up a lollipop or sitting on a whoopee cushion that is moving on a conveyor belt on a low table that they are sitting around. The panelists are allowed to make up to 40 guesses until they make 8 incorrect guesses. If they get a wrong answer, a strong gust of wind blows under their skirts. After 8 incorrect guesses, a contestant is given an opportunity. They only have 8 changes to guess a correct answer and they win $1000.

Episode 4 (first half) & 5-9
The panelists guess at the answers given by a survey of 50 people. The panelists are allowed to make as many guesses as there are answers. After their allotted number of guesses, a contestant is given an opportunity. They are given 8 chances to guess the correct answers from whatever number of answers that are left unanswered. For each correct answer, they are given $1000 for a total of up to $8000. This episode instituted a new method of guessing at an answer, that of going up to a small cube podium and hitting a buzzer. There is no penalty for guessing the wrong answer.

Episode 10-13
The show is separated into two segments. The first part is called [star Straight Talk! GO? STOP!] where they show what the 50 people they surveyed had to say about 2 of the 4 guests on that week. The comments range from polite to mean and are given levels with the first level, the polite comments, being revealed first. The guest is given an opportunity to respond to each comment. Any time the guest doesn't feel comfortable with the comments, they can put a stop to it by holding up a stop sign. The second part is a survey question like before, but rather than having to guess all the answers, they reveal all the answers EXCEPT one peculiar or odd one out. The panelists are divided into two teams: MC team and Guest Team. One side is given the answer and has to give hints to the other side to help them guess the answer. If they are able to correctly guess the answer, they are given $1000 to donate to a charity of their choice. If they aren't able to correctly guess the answer, the contestant who gave the original answer is given $1000.

List of episodes 
In the ratings below, the highest rating for the show will be in red, and the lowest rating for the show will be in blue.

References

2008 South Korean television series debuts
Korean-language television shows
South Korean variety television shows
2008 South Korean television series endings